Pourquoi Pas is an ice-covered point which forms the west side of the entrance to Victor Bay. It was charted by the French Antarctic Expedition, 1950–52, and named in 1954 after the French polar ship Pourquoi-Pas ?. (English translation: Why Not?)

External links
Pourquoi Pas Point image

Headlands of Adélie Land